Richard Lower may refer to:
 Richard Lower (physician) (1631–1691), British physician
 Richard Lower (poet) (1782–1865), English dialect poet
 Richard Lower (surgeon) (1929–2008), American cardiac surgeon